SexyMandarin is a company that sells Mandarin Chinese language learning videos featuring female models. It was founded by Kaoru Kikuchi and Michael Gleissner in December 2011.

References

External links 
 Official website

Companies established in 2011
Mandarin Chinese
Sexualization
Chinese educational websites